NBA Showtime is a basketball arcade game released by Midway in 1999, featuring teams and players from the National Basketball Association. The game is modeled after the NBA presentations on NBC and takes its name from NBC's NBA pregame show. It is the successor to Midway's previous basketball titles NBA Hangtime and NBA Jam and is the first in the series to have fully 3-D polygonal graphics. Showtime was also featured in a dual game cabinet along with NFL Blitz 2000 that Midway dubbed the "SportStation." Midway followed up the game with the console exclusive NBA Hoopz.

Gameplay
The game features gameplay similar to its predecessors NBA Jam and NBA Hangtime. Rather than typical 5 on 5 action, this game features 2 on 2 play with the ability to pick two players from any NBA team's starting line-up for the first half and can choose again for the second. The game introduces personal fouls for each shove on another player; after a certain number of fouls the opposing team gets a free throw. The game retains the series standard "on fire" feature. After a player makes three consecutive shots he becomes "on fire", which allows him to easily make shots from almost anywhere, as well as goaltend without penalty and push opponents without being charged a foul. Play otherwise is similar to NBA rules. The arcade version accommodates up to four players, as do the home versions produced for the Nintendo 64 and Dreamcast.

The players featured in the game include many of the most popular players of the particular year and era of the NBA season, but like the previous games in the arcade-style basketball series, many players were left out and each team has a limited number of players per position to choose from.

Development
Midway first hinted at the development of Showtime in the end credits to its previous basketball title, Maximum Hangtime, promising the next entry in the series would have a new "third dimension."

The announcer from NBA Jam, Tim Kitzrow, returned, after Midway used the Bulls radio announcer Neil Funk in NBA Hangtime. Jon Hey produced all the sound, music and script save for the NBC basketball theme "Roundball Rock" by John Tesh. At the time, the music was influenced by 2Pac and Dr. Dre's "California Love" and Master P's "Make 'Em Say Uhh!" and previous NBA Themes written by Jon Hey for NBA Jam and NBA Hangtime.

As with the previous NBA Jam and NBA Hangtime games, the game contains many secret characters, including members of the Midway staff. The arcade version features the Universal Monsters Frankenstein's monster, Bride of Frankenstein, The Mummy, The Wolf Man and  Creature from the Black Lagoon. The Universal Monsters characters remained exclusive to the arcade version and were not available in any of the game's various home versions.

The original arcade version shipped with team rosters from the beginning of the 1998–99 NBA season. After the release of the console versions, the game featured team rosters from prior to the 1999–2000 NBA season, then Midway released a "Gold" update for arcades with rosters from midway through the 1999-2000 NBA season, shortly before the midseason trading deadline.

Reception

The Dreamcast version received "favorable" reviews, and the Nintendo 64 and PlayStation versions received mixed or average reviews, while the Game Boy Color version received "unfavorable" reviews according to video game review aggregator GameRankings. Doug Trueman of NextGen said that the N64 version "would probably best be called NBA Jam 64", calling it "Arcade-style basketball action captured remarkably well on Nintendo 64."

References

External links
NBA Showtime at Eurocom

 NBA Showtime at The Arcade Flyer Archive

1999 video games
Arcade video games
National Basketball Association video games
Game Boy Color games
Nintendo 64 games
Dreamcast games
PlayStation (console) games
Midway video games
NBC Sports video games
Video games developed in the United Kingdom
Video games developed in the United States
Video games scored by Jonathan Hey
Eurocom games
Multiplayer and single-player video games
Torus Games games